William Roscoe Leake (April 12, 1961 – September 2, 2006), better known as Willi Ninja, was an American dancer and choreographer best known for his appearance in the documentary film Paris Is Burning.

Ninja, a gay man known as the godfather of voguing, was a fixture of ball culture at Harlem's drag balls who took inspiration from sources as far-flung as Fred Astaire and the world of haute couture to develop a unique style of dance and movement. He caught the attention of Paris Is Burning director Jennie Livingston, who featured Ninja prominently in the film. The film, both a critical and box office success, served as a springboard for Ninja. He parlayed his appearance into performances with a number of dance troupes and choreography gigs.

In 1989, Ninja starred in the music video for Malcolm McLaren's song "Deep in Vogue", which sampled the then-unfinished movie and brought Ninja's style to the mainstream. One year after this, Madonna released her number one song "Vogue", bringing further attention to the dancing style.

Early life
Born at Long Island Jewish Medical Center in New Hyde Park, New York, Willi was a self-taught dancer and was perfecting his voguing style by his twenties. Willi was born to a black mother and was of mixed racial ancestry, claiming to have Irish, Cherokee, and Asian ancestors. It was from fellow voguers in Washington Square Park that Jennie Livingston first heard his name. While he did not create the form, he worked at refining it with clean, sharp movements to "an amazing level". His influences included Kemetic hieroglyphics, young Michael Jackson, Fred Astaire, Olympic gymnasts, and Asian culture.

Career
He participated in Harlem's drag balls with 'children' from his House of Ninja. Like other ball houses, HoN was a combination of extended social family and dance troupe, with Ninja as its Mother. He taught his children late into the night on the old Christopher Street pier and at the underground clubs.

Ninja was a featured dancer in many music videos including Malcolm McLaren's "Deep in Vogue" and "I Can't Get No Sleep" by Masters At Work featuring India. In 1994, he released his single "Hot" (another Masters At Work production) on Nervous Records. Ninja's later career included runway modeling for Jean-Paul Gaultier, performing with dance companies under Karole Armitage, and providing instruction to Paris Hilton on perfecting her walk. He opened a modeling agency, Elements of Ninja, in 2004, and made an appearance on Jimmy Kimmel Live!. Ninja was also prominently featured in the 1990 documentary Paris is Burning and the 2006 documentary release How Do I Look directed by Wolfgang Busch.

Ninja also danced in two of Janet Jackson's videos from her album Rhythm Nation 1814, one of which was "Alright", whose remix featured late rap star Heavy D and cameo appearances by Cab Calloway, Cyd Charisse, and The Nicholas Brothers. He also was featured in "Escapade".

Ninja worked hard to care for his mother, Esther Leake, who had Parkinson's and used a wheelchair. Her trips with Ninja to the ballet and the Apollo were inspiration for his later endeavors in dance.

House of Ninja 

Willi Ninja started the House of Ninja in 1982 with Sandy Apollonia Ninja, despite not having been part of a house previously or winning three grand prizes, which was generally seen as a requirement to start a house. The name Ninja came from the house's Asian and martial arts influences coupled with the fact that people in the ballroom scene did not know who they were and they "seemed to come out of nowhere". The House of Ninja had a reputation for being multiracial; except the Latino House of Xtravaganza, most houses at the time were African-American.

The House of Ninja notably included white men in their competitions. The house closed in 1989 and reopened for a second time in 1991 and reopened a third time by 2003. The House of Ninja currently has over 220 members worldwide. The oldest living Ninja is Archie Burnett Ninja.

In film 
Ninja starred in a handful of films and television series. On August 8, 1991, he was a guest on The Joan Rivers Show alongside some of his Paris Is Burning cast members such as Dorian Corey and Pepper LaBeija. Jennie Livingston also starred. In the episode, the cast talked about the docufilm and encouraged audience members to "walk" as if a participant at a Drag Ball. In the same year, Ninja starred in the Marlon Riggs 9-minute short Anthem as a dancer.

Death and legacy
Ninja died of AIDS-related heart failure in New York City on September 2, 2006. 

Since his death, he has continued to inspire many artists and music DJs. Ninja is a central figure in LGBTQ studies, gender studies, and performance studies for his nonconforming and transgressive gender expression as an artist. His presence is articulated in the book Black Sexualities by Juan Battle and Sandra L. Barnes as one example.

See also 
 LGBT culture in New York City
 List of LGBT people from New York City

References

External links

Village Voice Eulogy
Life Magazine Retrospective
New York Times obituary

1961 births
2006 deaths
African-American male dancers
American male dancers
African-American choreographers
American choreographers
LGBT African Americans
People from Middletown, Orange County, New York
Nightlife in New York City
AIDS-related deaths in New York (state)
House of Ninja
LGBT people from New York (state)
20th-century American dancers
20th-century African-American people
21st-century African-American people
20th-century American LGBT people